Jesse Steven Kahuanani Mahelona (April 7, 1983 – September 5, 2009) was an American football defensive tackle in the National Football League. He was drafted by the Tennessee Titans in the fifth round of the 2006 NFL Draft. He played college football at Tennessee.

Mahelona was also a member of the Miami Dolphins, Atlanta Falcons, and Jacksonville Jaguars.

College career
Mahelona attended and played college football at the University of Tennessee under head coach Phillip Fulmer. He contributed in the 2004 and 2005 seasons as a junior college transfer from Orange Coast College in Costa Mesa, California.

Professional career

Tennessee Titans
He was drafted by the Tennessee Titans in the fifth round of the 2006 NFL Draft. He played ten games for the Titans in the 2006 season, and was released on September 11, 2007.

Miami Dolphins
On October 24, 2007, Mahelona was waived by the Miami Dolphins.

Atlanta Falcons
Mahelona was signed by the Atlanta Falcons on November 20 when Rod Coleman was placed on injured reserve. He was cut on December 29, 2007.

Jacksonville Jaguars
Mahelona was signed by the Jacksonville Jaguars on August 7, 2008, after defensive tackle Tywain Myles was waived. He was cut August 30. He did not make the opening day roster.

Death
Mahelona was killed in an automobile accident in Hawaii early on the morning of September 5, 2009. Mahelona's vehicle collided with construction equipment.  Police reported that speed and alcohol were factors in the crash.

References

External links
Tennessee Volunteers bio
Jacksonville Jaguars bio

1983 births
2009 deaths
Players of American football from Honolulu
American football defensive tackles
Tennessee Volunteers football players
Tennessee Titans players
Miami Dolphins players
Atlanta Falcons players
Jacksonville Jaguars players
Road incident deaths in Hawaii
Alcohol-related deaths in Hawaii